Kope–Ribnica Pohorje Ski Resort is a joined Slovenian ski resort located in western part of Pohorje mountain in municipality of Slovenj Gradec and Ribnica na Pohorju. 

Kope is one area resort and a few kilometers away Ribnica Pohorje, consisting of the ski areas "Ribnica Hut" and "Ribnica na Pohorju". Today they are presented as one resort.

Resort statistics
Elevation
Summit - 1,542 m / (5,058 ft)
Base - 715 m / (2,345 ft)

Ski Terrain

Slope Difficulty
/

Vertical Drop
- 827 m (2712 ft) in total

Longest Run: "Kaštivnik" 

Average Winter Daytime Temperature: 

Average Annual Snowfall: 

Lift Capacity: 7,600 skiers per hour (all together)

Ski Season Opens: December

Ski Season Ends: April 

Snow Conditions Phone Line: +386 (0) 2 2208885

Other activities
mountain biking, hiking
Cross country skiing (16 km/10 miles)

Ski lifts

GTC Kope (1010m - 1542m)

Ribnica Pohorje (736m - 1525m)

External links
 

Ski areas and resorts in Slovenia
Pohorje